Aldo-keto reductase family 1 (AKR1) is a family of aldo-keto reductase enzymes that is involved in steroid metabolism. It includes the AKR1C and AKR1D subgroups, which respectively consist of AKR1C1–AKR1C4 and AKR1D1. The AKR1C enzymes act as 3-, 17- and 20-ketosteroid reductases, while AKR1D1 acts as the sole 5β-reductase in humans.

Members
AKR1A1; AKR1B1; AKR1B10; AKR1C1; AKR1C2; AKR1C3; AKR1C4; AKR1D1; Others

See also
 Steroidogenic enzyme

References

Enzymes